National Route 404 is a national highway of Japan connecting Nagaoka, Niigata and Jōetsu, Niigata in Japan, with a total length of 95.7 km (59.47 mi).

References

National highways in Japan
Roads in Niigata Prefecture